Butler Township is one of thirteen townships in Franklin County, Indiana. As of the 2010 census, its population was 1,318.

History
Butler Township was established in 1849. Butler Township is named after Butler County, Ohio, the native home of many of its early settlers.

Geography

Unincorporated towns
 Oak Forest
 Saint Marys
(This list is based on USGS data and may include former settlements.)

Adjacent townships
 Metamora Township (north)
 Brookville Township (northeast)
 Highland Township (east)
 Adams Township, Ripley County (south)
 Ray Township (west)
 Salt Creek Township (northwest)

Cemeteries
The township contains one cemetery, Wolf Creek.

References
 
 United States Census Bureau cartographic boundary files

External links
 Indiana Township Association
 United Township Association of Indiana

Townships in Franklin County, Indiana
Townships in Indiana